Hoppenhof can refer to:

 Hoppenhof, German name of Ape, Latvia
 Den Hoppenhof – former Michelin starred restaurant in Geldrop, The Netherlands